Salil Chowdhury (19 November 1925 – 5 September 1995) was an Indian music director, songwriter, lyricist, writer and poet who predominantly composed for Bengali, Hindi and Malayalam films. He composed music for films in 13 languages. This includes over 75 Hindi films, 41 Bengali films, 27 Malayalam films, and a few Marathi, Tamil, Telugu, Kannada, Gujarati, Odia and Assamese films. His musical ability was widely recognised and acknowledged in the Indian film industry. He was an accomplished composer and arranger who was proficient in several musical instruments, including flute, the piano, and the esraj. He was also widely acclaimed and admired for his inspirational and original poetry in Bengali.

The first Bengali film for which Chowdhury composed music was Paribortan, released in 1949. Mahabharati, released in 1994, was the last of the 41 Bengali films where he rendered his music. He is affectionately called Salilda by his admirers.

Career

Early influences – childhood and teenage 
Salil Chowdhury was born on 19 November 1925, in a village called Ghazipur in South 24 Parganas, West Bengal. Salil's childhood was spent in the Tea Gardens Region of Assam. His father was reputed to stage plays with coolies and other low-paid workers of the tea-gardens. While his father, Dr Gyanendra Chowdhury, was the Medical Officer at Hathikuli Tea Estate near Kaziranga in Assam, between 1931 and 1951, the Chief Medical Officer was Dr Maloni, an Irish national. During his early years, he used to listen to western orchestral music on Dr Maloni's gramophone. To date, this information stands engraved in black granite in Hathikuli Tea Estate in his memory. During the second world war Chowdhury got the opportunity to closely observe human sufferings, hunger and problem of the refugees. He studied in Harinavi D.V.A.S High School and there after graduating from Bangabasi College, affiliated to the University of Calcutta in Kolkata, and during this period his political ideas were formulated along with a considerable maturity in his musical ideas.

As a teenager in school, Chowdhury already had an interest in music, and played the flute, harmonium and esraj. He learnt to play the piano from his elder brother at the age of 6. Once in college, he also began to compose tunes. His first popular song was "Becharpoti tomar bichaar" (lit. the days of new judgement have come because people are now awake), set to a kirtan tune. Chowdhury composed it in 1945 during the Indian National Army trials when the freedom fighters had returned from Andaman jail. Chowdhury shifted to a village in 24 parganas to live with his maternal uncles, when he was witness to a big peasant uprising there in 1943. He got involved with them and began writing songs for the peasant movement. In 1944, while studying for his MA, Chowdhury witnessed people dying on the streets of Calcutta, as 50 lakh Bengalis died during the famine. The famine was man-made as local rice was instead directed to Britain's war effort overseas, leading to scarcity, aggravated by black marketeers and hoarders. This led Chowdhury to become fully involved in the peasant movement, and he became a full-time member of IPTA and the Communist Party. Subsequently, arrest warrants were issued in his name, and he went underground in the Sunderbans, hiding in paddy fields and supported by local peasants. During this time, he continued writing plays and songs.

In 1944, a young Salil came to Calcutta for his graduate studies. He joined the IPTA (Indian Peoples Theater Association) the cultural wing of the Communist Party of India. He started writing songs and setting tunes for them. The IPTA theatrical outfit travelled through the villages and the cities bringing these songs to the common man. Songs like Bicharpati, Runner and Abak prithibi became extremely popular with the general population at the time.

Songs like Gnaayer bodhu (গাঁয়ের বধূ), which he composed at the age of 20, brought about a new wave of Bengali music. Almost every notable singer at the time from West Bengal had sung at least one of his songs. A few examples are Debabrata Biswas, Manna Dey, Hemanta Mukherjee, Shyamal Mitra, Sandhya Mukherjee, Manabendra Mukherjee, Subir Sen, and Pratima Banerjee.

Film career 
 The first Bengali film in which Salil Chowdhury composed music was Paribortan, released in 1949. Mahabharati, released in 1994, was the last of the 41 Bengali films where he rendered his music.

In an interview with All India Radio, Salil Chowdhury described his coming to Bombay in 1953 as a "stroke of luck". He was writing the script for a Bengali film about a peasant who was disowned of his land and had gone to Calcutta to earn money as a Rickshaw puller. Hrishikesh Mukherjee, who heard of it from Chowdhury during a visit to Calcutta, liked it immensely and suggested that he narrate it to the director Bimal Roy. Roy heard it, and asked him to meet him again the next morning. However, when Chowdhury went to meet him the next day, he learnt that Roy had rushed to Bombay on an urgent call. A week later, he received a telegram from Roy that he wanted to turn his script into a movie. This resulted in Chowdhury's debut in the Hindi film industry in 1953 as the music director for Do Bigha Zamin (1953). The movie was based on Tagore's poem by the same name, but the story was different and was written by Salil Chowdhury himself. Directed by Bimal Roy, this film took his career to new heights when it became the first film to win the Filmfare Best Movie Award and won the international Prize at the Cannes Film Festival.

After working for about 20 years in Bengali and Hindi films, he entered the Malayalam film industry and, in 1964, composed music for the movie Chemmeen. He went on to compose music for films in 13 languages. This includes over 75 Hindi films, 41 Bengali films, around 27 Malayalam films, and a few Marathi, Tamil, Telugu, Kannada, Gujarati, Odia and Assamese films. Asked about his method, Chowdhury described it thus – He would usually ask the film maker to explain the situation to him, then Chowdhury would compose a tune to suit the mood, and the lyric writer would set in words. This remained his practice for most of his films including Madhumati, in which Shailendra wrote the lyrics subsequently.

During the 1971 Bangladesh Liberation War, Chowdhury contributed to the programmes of the Swadhin Bangla Betar Kendra based in Kolkata. His 1971 album Bangla Amar Bangla was meant for the liberation struggle. Later, when Chowdhury visited Bangladesh in 1990, he was given the welcome of a mass leader in Dhaka. Chowdhury was posthumously awarded the Muktijoddha Maitreye Samman in 2012.

Poet, Playwright, Short story writer, Salil also directed a film Pinjre Ke Panchhi starring Meena Kumari, Balraj Sahani and Mehmood based
on his own story and screenplay in 1966.
Salil Chowdhury was the Founder of Bombay Youth Choir, the first ever Secular Choir in India in 1958 as its composer and conductor -
he inspired scores of secular choir groups to be formed throughout India formulating a new genre of music using vocal polyphony for
Indian Folk and Contemporary Music.

Personal life 
Salil Chowdhury married the painter Jyoti Chowdhury in July 1952 in a temple. He had three daughters with her – Aloka, Tulika and Lipika. Later, he had a court marriage with singer Sabita Banerjee, with whom he had two sons, Sukanta and Sanjoy, and two daughters, Antara and Sanchari. Sanjoy Chowdhury is a successful music composer and has scored music for over 100 feature films. Sabita Chowdhury was a legendary singer and their daughter Antara Chowdhury too a known singer. Smt. Sabita Chowdhury died on 29 June 2017.

Legacy 

Salil's music was a blending of Eastern and the Western music traditions. He had once said: "I want to create a style which shall transcend borders – a genre which is emphatic and polished, but never predictable". He dabbled in a lot of things and it was his ambition to achieve greatness in everything he did. But at times, his confusion was fairly evident: "I do not know what to opt for: poetry, story writing, orchestration or composing for films. I just try to be creative with what fits the moment and my temperament", he once told a journalist.
Salil's love for Western classical music started when he was a young boy growing up in an Assam tea garden where his father worked as a doctor. His father inherited a large number of western classical records and a gramophone from a departing Irish doctor. While Salil listened to Mozart, Beethoven, Tchaikovsky, Chopin, and others everyday, his daily life was surrounded by the sound of the forest, chirping of the birds, sound of the flute and the local folk-music of Assam. This left a lasting impression in young Salil. He became a self-taught flute player and his favourite composer was Mozart. His compositions often used folk melodies or melodies based on Indian classical ragas but the orchestration was very much western in its construction. According to his daughter Antara, (Ref.: Ek Fankar @ Vividbharati Radio Programme at 10.00 pm on 19 November 2013), Salil himself once joked that he was Mozart, reborn.
Salil being a composing exponent, he even sensed the talent of a guitarist who played in his orchestra and uttered that, "I think he’s going to be the best composer in India". The guitarist eventually turned out to be Maestro Ilaiyaraaja. A. R Rahman's father, R. K Shekhar used to conduct Salil Chowdhury's arrangements in South Indian film music. Rahman once said that his musical understanding was greatly influenced by the musical sessions conducted by Salil Chowdhury.
"The Salil Chowdhury Foundation of Music, Social Help & Education Trust" was created in 2002 by Sabita Chowdhury, wife, and Antara Chowdhury, daughter of the late composer, to carry forward the legacy and preserve the works of Salil Chowdhury. In 2015 the Salil Chowdhury Memorial Concert and Honours were established in memory of the Genius to honour some of the greatest Indian singers and musicians.

Filmography 

Hindi

Bengali

Malayalam

Others

Discography 
List of some songs for which music or lyrics were composed by Salil Chowdhury (in alphabetical order)

IPTA:: Indian People's Theater Association

Awards and recognitions 
1953 – Do Bigha Zamin
A Hindi film directed by Bimal Roy based on a story in Bengali "Rikshawalaa" written by Salil Chowdhury.

1st Filmfare Awards (1954)
Winner – Best Film; Winner – Best Director – Bimal Roy;

1st National Film Awards (India)
Winner – All India Certificate of Merit for Best Feature Film

7th Cannes Film Festival (1954)
Winner – Prix International (International Prize)
Nominated – Grand Prize (Best Film)

Karlovy Vary International Film Festival
Winner – Prize for Social Progress

1965 – Chemmeen
A Malayalam film directed by Ramu Kariat, based on a novel of the same name written by the renowned writer Thakazhy Shivshankar Pillai, where Music Direction was done by Salil Chowdhury.

Recipient of president's gold medal in 1965.

1958 – Madhumati
Received Filmfare Best Music Director Award along with eight other Filmfare awards
Madhumati won the National Film Awards for Best Feature Film in Hindi

The Uttar Pradesh Film Patrakar Sangh Puraskar in 1966 for his only Hindi directorial film 'Pinjre Ke Panchhi'

The Bengal Films Journalist Award, Kolkata in 1973

The Allauddin Smriti Puraskar in 1985 from the Govt of West Bengal

1988 – Salil Chowdhury received Sangeet Natak Akademi Award

The Maharashtra Gaurav Puraskar Award in 1990

Posthumously he was awarded the Mukti Judhho Maitreyi Samman Award by the Govt
Bangladesh in 2012.

Poet, Playwright, Short story writer, he also directed a film Pinjre Ke Panchhi starring Meena Kumari, Balraj Sahani and Mehmood b

References

Further reading

External links 

A comprehensive website on Salil Chowdhury

1925 births
1995 deaths
People from South 24 Parganas district
Bengali musicians
Bengali Hindus
Filmfare Awards winners
Hindi film score composers
Assamese film score composers
Indian male composers
Indian People's Theatre Association people
Malayalam film score composers
Musicians from Kolkata
20th-century Indian composers
Kannada film score composers
Bengali film score composers
Bangabasi College alumni
University of Calcutta alumni
Recipients of the Sangeet Natak Akademi Award
Male film score composers
20th-century male musicians